Peter Yates (1928–2011) was a film director.

Peter Yates may also refer to:

 Peter W. Yates (1747–1826), colonel in the Continental Army and New York legislator
 Peter Yates (architect) (1920–1982), English artist and architect
 Peter Yates (athlete) (born 1958), English athlete